Ángel Sánchez (born October 7, 1960) is a Venezuelan fashion designer. He specializes in evening wear and bridal designs. He was inspired to enter fashion by his mother, who was an atelier, and combined that with his knowledge of architecture, which he practiced for many years and refers to as his "first love". 
Sánchez's designs reflect his architectural discipline and structure while creating new shapes and proportions that hold true to the timeless perfection of traditional couture. His designs are architectural, contemporary, and feminine; which always include a touch of drama.

References

External links
 http://www.angelsanchezusa.com/index.php
 http://www.angelsanchezusa.com/bio.php
 http://www.wwd.com/runway/bridal-spring-2015/review/angel-sanchez

Venezuelan fashion designers
Living people
Venezuelan expatriates in the United States
1960 births